Naserpur, or Nasarpur, is a small City in Sindh, Pakistan.

Historical background
According to Hakeem Fateh Mohammad Sehwani (book Abo-al-fazal) Naserpur was one of the major city along with Umar Kot, Thatta and Sewistan (Sehwan). Mohammad Yousaf Shakir Abro Sindhi has described in Raisala Bursat that after establishment of Mansoora city during Arabic era gradually vanished the Berhaman Abad city and remaining Hindus has been migrated and settled in Nasarpur.

Mirza Kalich Beg has described the Naserpur history and re-establish during Soomra kingdom from 720 to 1320. Dodha khan, Mirza Shah Baig Arkhon 928, Mirza Shah Hasan Arkhon 942, MIrza Tukhan, MIrza Qasim Arkhon and Sultan Abo al Qasim ruled in this region. Ali Sher Fateh Thathwi has mentioned the appearance of Meer Naseer in 752. Unfortunately, The complete history of the Naserpur was not described or kept in any historical book. The archaeological sites, old Masjeed, Tomb, destructive Fort provides the evidence that Nasarpur is a historical city.
Nasarpur is a very ancient city of Sindh, whose real name is Mata Lui. It was built in 132 AH by the governor of Sindh, Nasr bin Mohammed Bin Al-Sha'at al-Khuzai, whose mention is clearly written in Atta Muhammad Bhandro's book Sakari Sindh and Takaharu Man.

Naserpur today
Naserpur is a famous city in the province of Sindh, Pakistan. Its neighbor cities are Tando Allahyar, Matiari, Pali Jani, Odero Lal, Allah Dino Sand, Tajpoor, Tando Soomro, Tando Jam, Hyderabad and Mirpurkhas.

Shah Inayatullah Rizvi

Shah Inayat, famous Sindhi Sufi also spent his life in the town of Naserpur. He was a poet of great merit in the Sindhi language. His shrine is in the town of Nasarpur. Eminent poet, Hazrat Misri Shah Imam Sindhi also come from his family.

Administration and population
Naserpur comprises one Town Municipal Administration office and 2 Union Councils. According to Census 2010 city population is 52,000. There are three main gates to enter the town of Naserpur.

Source of income
People of Naserpur are more inclined towards the agricultural based lifestyle. The fertile Indus Plains provide a valuable source of income for the locals who practice farming on these lands. Onion/Mango/Bananas of Naserpur is known in market of Asia,

City visibility
Naserpur is one of Historical, Literary, Religious Spiritual town of Sindh. This town is also famous throughout Pakistan in Pottery, Ceramic craft( Known as Kashi Art), Khes, carpet and artisanship. It is also a holy place for the Hindu community.

City division

Naserpur city contains 8 wards and 4 Deh, including; Deh Naserpur, Deh Bhanoki, Deh Bhatk and Deh Dhoro Lakhmir.

ward 1. Nihalani Muhllah, Peer Jurial Shah( Daudpota, Kashigar Mohalla), Bukhari Muhllah (Dars Muhllah)
ward 2. Meer Mohalla (Dung Mohalla, Memon Mohalla etc.) 
ward 3. Ghirana Mohallah, Qureshi, Daudpota Mohallah
ward 4. Almani Mohalla, Wadera Pandhiani Mohalla, Kazi Mohalla 
ward 5. Daudpota Mohalla,Abra Mohalla, Purani Shahi Bazar, Noorani Mohall (the city's East part ) [Central Area of City]
ward 6. Memon Muhalla 
Arain Mohalla, Dewan Mohalla (the oldest Mohalla of city), Mughal Mohalla, Hajana Mohala 
In ward 6 
House of Abdul Rehman memon s/o Ameer Maviyo Memon
ward 7. Khanzada Mohalla, Purani Sabzi Market, Gossht Market, Umrani Mohalla 
ward 8. Drgha Syed Mehmood Shah Jeelani, Syed Mohalla, Dargah Syed Missri Shah Imam, Arbab Mohalla (Arbab House), Market Area, Bhanu Mohallah, Subhopota Mohala, Dargah syed Hashim Shah Almaroof Gul Peer.

Villages
Bismillah Town, Arbab Farm House (Arbab Muhammad Hassan Village), Goth Mujeri Haji Muhammad Umer Daudpota, Mohalla Garibabad, Jatoi Mohalla, Gulshan-e-Mehdi, Gulshan-e-Fazil, Goth Qazi Abdul Majeed Bhanoki Naserpur, Dhoro Lakhmir Youfani Farm, Qaim Lashari Goth, Dr Sohail Almani, Moj Khan Muhajr, Ameen Muhammad Lund, Goth Hadi Buksh Rind Goth Muhammad Ameen kakepota, Gul Muhammad kakepota, Aijaz shah Bhukhari Haji Jhando lakhari, Malook Bubr, Bago khan jatoi, Goth Chaudry Barkat Ali Arain ,village Haji Fateh Mohammad Arain, village Haji Abdul Sattar Arain and Farm house, 'Mansoor Majeed Arain Mango Farm, Dano Brohi, Goth Allah Bachaya Unar, Goth Alam chhuto, Mukhtiar Shah Farm, Goth Muhammad Idrees Khanzada, Khuda bux Bhati, Goth Imdad Khan Nizamani, Anwar Khan Nizamani, Major Ghulam Mustafa Pandhiani (Wadero), (Bhatki) Bhell colony.

Health
Medical services available in city are, Rural health center Naserpur, OPD ultrasound-ray, E.C.G, Dental and Eye department.

Industries
(2) Samer Kashi Centre by Mr.Muhammad Siddique kashigar 
(3) Sindh kashi Centre by Irfan Ali Kashi Gar . He has taken special efforts to keep the Kashi culture alive till today. There is also a factory called
by name of Muhammad Ayoub Kashiger. Galeecha sazi (Carpet work) is also one of the oldest industry in Naserpur working under Sindh Small Industries Corporation. There are couple of Individuals and domestic partners too. Ceramic Center is also one of the leading revenue generating industry. KHES' cola bloor botel small factory 1913 Dost Muhammad Ghirano industry is also an oldest industry in Naserpur. It produces cotton and silk Khes, Lungi, Mooshi, Garbi, and clothes.

Naserpur SweetsKheer Pura'' is a kind of sweet which is prepared from milk products and saffron. Naserpuri  kheer pura is liked in all over Sindh. Mushtaque Ahmed Memon of Naserpur introduced this Sweet. Now it is Available at Memon Sweet Shop Near Eid Gaah whose owner is Mr. Imtiaz Ahmed Memon S/o Karim Bux Memon. It is famous due to its fine flavors and presented as a gift and special sweet like Sohan halwa of Multan and Khoya of Khanpur.

Sports
Naserpur is quite healthy for numerous sports activities. 
Mainly "MALH", "WANJH WATI" "KODI KODI", Volley Ball, Cricket, football etc. are widely played, though the first three of these traditional games of Sindh are not played extensively these days.
"MALH" and "KODI KODI" are mainly played on annual Misri Shah festival while "WANJH WATI is only played when there is rainy season. But you will find everyone widely involved in Cricket specially age between 15 and 40 are heavily involved in this sports.

There is one Volley Ball Club. There was the time when there was played Hard Ball cricket and Shaheen Cricket Club, Shaheed Mumtaz Friends Cricket Club, Shaheed Mumtaz Lovers Cricket Club, Mehran Cricket Club, Shaheed ANSAR cricket club, Hiadri Cricket Club and few others team used to play with that hard ball but soon Hard Ball cricket vanished away from Nasarpur and now everywhere played with tape ball.

See also
 Ramapir Temple Tando Allahyar
Khes

References

Villages in Sindh
Ghost towns in Pakistan